Aleksandr Sergeyev may refer to:

 Aleksandr Sergeyev (canoeist) (born 1994), Russian canoeist
 Aleksandr Sergeyev (chess player) (1897–1970), Russian chess player
 Aleksandr Sergeyev (footballer, born 1998), Russian football player
 Alexander Sergeev (physicist) (born 1955), Russian physicist
 Aleksandr Sergeyev (triple jumper) (born 1983), Russian triple jumper